Luan de Freitas Molarinho Chagas (born 4 March 2003), known as Luan Freitas, is a Brazilian footballer who plays as a midfielder for Fluminense.

Club career
Luan Freitas made his professional debut for Fluminense on 22 January 2023. He had been on loan from Série D side Atlético Cearense, and a week later, on 31 January 2023, the move was made permanent.

Career statistics

Club

References

2003 births
Living people
Sportspeople from Ceará
Brazilian footballers
Association football midfielders
FC Atlético Cearense players
Fluminense FC players